Oliver Dustin (born 29 November 2000) is a British middle-distance runner.

Dustin is a native of Workington and attends Birmingham University. On 12 June 2021 in Nice, Dustin ran the 800 metres in a time of 1.43.82. With this he broke Seb Coe’s under 23 British record and was the 5th fastest all-time by a British runner. It was also temporarily the world-leading time for the year. On the 27 June, 2021 at the British Championship and Olympic Trials event in Manchester, Dustin finished second in the 800 metres to Elliot Giles, which qualified him for the 2020 Summer Olympics.

References

External links
 

2000 births
Living people
British male middle-distance runners
Sportspeople from Workington
Olympic athletes of Great Britain
Athletes (track and field) at the 2020 Summer Olympics